Taylor Township is one of twelve townships in Harrison County, Indiana. As of the 2010 census, its population was 781 and it contained 345 housing units.

Geography

Unincorporated towns
 Buena Vista
 Elbert
 Evans Landing
 Fishtown
 Happy Hollow
 Macedonia
 New Boston
 Rosewood
(This list is based on USGS data and may include former settlements.)

References

External links
 Indiana Township Association
 United Township Association of Indiana

Harrison County History and Genealogy

Townships in Harrison County, Indiana
Townships in Indiana